The 2002 NCAA Division I men's ice hockey tournament involved 12 schools playing in single-elimination play to determine the national champion of men's  NCAA Division I college ice hockey.

The final event was played at Xcel Energy Center, Saint Paul, Minnesota. The University of Minnesota, coached by Don Lucia, won its first NCAA title since 1979 by defeating the University of Maine, coached by Tim Whitehead, 4-3, in overtime on April 6. Matt Koalska tied the game with 53 seconds remaining in regulation with Minnesota goaltender Adam Hauser pulled for an extra attacker. Grant Potulny then won it on his power-play goal at 16:58 of the extra session, giving the Golden Gophers their fourth NCAA championship (6th overall). Minnesota senior forward John Pohl assisted on both the tying and winning goals in his final game in a Gophers uniform.

Minnesota advanced to the finals with a 3-2 semifinal win over Michigan on April 4, after Maine had bested Hockey East rival New Hampshire by a 7-2 score in the other semifinal.

Game locations

The NCAA Men's Division I Ice Hockey Championship is a single-elimination tournament featuring 12 teams representing five Division I conferences in the nation.  The Championship Committee seeds the entire field from 1 to 12 within two regionals of 6 teams. The winners of five Division I conference championships receive automatic bids to participate in the NCAA Championship. The top regional placements are given to the best teams from each of the two regions (East and West) while the remaining 10 teams are seeded based upon their rankings regardless of region.

Regional Sites
 East Regional – Centrum Centre, Worcester, Massachusetts
 West Regional – Yost Ice Arena, Ann Arbor, Michigan

Championship Site
 Frozen Four – Xcel Energy Center, Saint Paul, Minnesota

Qualifying teams
The at-large bids and seeding for each team in the tournament were announced after the conference tournaments concluded on March 17, 2002. The Western Collegiate Hockey Association (WCHA) had four teams receive a berth in the tournament, Hockey East had three teams receive a berth in the tournament, the Central Collegiate Hockey Association (CCHA), and the ECAC each had two berths, while the Metro Atlantic Athletic Conference (MAAC) received a single bid for its tournament champion.

Number in parentheses denotes overall seed in the tournament.

Bracket

East Regional

West Regional

Frozen Four

Note: * denotes overtime period(s)

Regional Quarterfinals

East Regional

(3) Maine vs. (6) Harvard

(4) Cornell vs. (5) Quinnipiac

West Regional

(3) Michigan State vs. (6) Colorado College

(4) Michigan vs. (5) St. Cloud State

Regional semifinals

East Regional

(1) New Hampshire vs. (4) Cornell

(2) Boston University vs. (3) Maine

West Regional

(1) Denver vs. (4) Michigan

(2) Minnesota vs. (6) Colorado College

Frozen Four

National semifinal

(E1) New Hampshire vs. (E3) Maine

(W2) Minnesota vs. (W4) Michigan

National Championship

(W2) Minnesota vs. (E3) Maine

All-Tournament team
G: Adam Hauser (Minnesota)
D: Peter Metcalf (Maine)
D: Michael Schutte (Maine)
F: Róbert Liščák (Maine)
F: John Pohl (Minnesota)
F: Grant Potulny* (Minnesota)
* Most Outstanding Player(s)

Record by conference

References

Tournament
NCAA Division I men's ice hockey tournament
NCAA Men's Division Ice Hockey Tournament
NCAA Men's Division Ice Hockey Tournament
NCAA Men's Division Ice Hockey Tournament
NCAA Men's Division Ice Hockey Tournament
NCAA Men's Division Ice Hockey Tournament
2000s in Minneapolis
Ice hockey competitions in Worcester, Massachusetts
Ice hockey competitions in Michigan
Sports competitions in Michigan
Ice hockey competitions in Saint Paul, Minnesota
Sports in Ann Arbor, Michigan